Erik Lindbom is a retired Swedish footballer. Lindbom made 21 Allsvenskan appearances for Djurgården and scored 16 goals.

References

Swedish footballers
Allsvenskan players
Djurgårdens IF Fotboll players
Association footballers not categorized by position
Year of birth missing